Neil Penswick is a British writer born in the 1960s, who was known writing a Doctor Who story for Season 27, entitled: "Hostage", a three-part thriller. He also was social worker to help people who were abused.

Writing career  
Penswick started writing Doctor Who around 1988 till 1993, then in the mid 1990s wrote episodes for the television drama: Casualty. He then made a short film in June 2012 as, Parental Love, and was assumed for being a recurring contributor to writers Jean-Marc and Randy Lofficier.

Personal life 
When quitting as a writer, Penswick started work on child protection services, as an advisor to prevent child abuse. He then was a specialized social worker. He has had two children. He lives in Britain and spends most of his free-time reading and going places. He was born on 4 April 1962.

About Doctor Who: Hostage
Synopsis

The story would feature the Doctor encounter an android war attack on a mission to take out two sinister, shape shifting creatures: Butler and Swarfe.

Production

Penswick submitted the story in 1988, and commissioned Hostage in 1992 to former script editor Andrew Cartmel when he wanted the story to be part of Doctor Who's next season: Season 27, but never made way to screens, due to the BBC announcing since September 1989 that, Doctor Who was to be cancelled after its 26th Season.

In Penswick's quote about the story he considered: 
It's about an unique group of soldiers, whilst they were searching to stop creatures Butler and Swarfe whom have stolen a weapon and taken it to a jungle. In the end of the first episode, there was a change of the character Swarfe in this monster before Swarfe went hunting in the second episode ... it was Doctor Who: "meets Predator and Aliens" (by a concept)

References

British writers
1970s births
Living people